Wee Tee State Forest is a State Forest in Georgetown County, South Carolina and Williamsburg County, South Carolina. Purchased in 2004, the forest consists mainly of bottomland hardwood forest set in the Santee River floodplain.

It has  of river front and includes a  lake with various oxbows and ponds.

References

South Carolina state forests
2004 establishments in South Carolina